Abdelkader Youmir is a Moroccan football manager and former player.

Career
After finishing college, Youmir played senior football with his home town club KAC Kénitra. In 1975, he studied abroad in Brussels, where he played semi-pro football with KSV Alsemberg.

When Youmir returned to Morocco, he began a career as a manager. He led his home town club KAC Kénitra during the 1985–86 and 2001–02 seasons, before returning in 2009. He managed several clubs in Morocco, Bahrain, Kuwait and Saudi Arabia. He won the 1994-95 Botola with COD Meknès and the 1996 CAF Cup with Kawkab Marrakech. In 2010, Youmir managed Chabab Rif Al Hoceima during its maiden season in the Botola.

References

Living people
Moroccan footballers
Moroccan football managers
Olympique Club de Khouribga managers
Maghreb de Fès managers
Moghreb Tétouan managers
SCC Mohammédia managers
COD Meknès managers
Association footballers not categorized by position
Year of birth missing (living people)
Al-Nasr SC (Kuwait) managers
Kuwait Premier League managers
Al-Ahli Club Manama managers
Kawkab Marrakech managers
Abha Club managers
KAC Kénitra players
Damac FC managers
Moroccan expatriate sportspeople in Kuwait
Moroccan expatriate sportspeople in Bahrain
Moroccan expatriate sportspeople in Saudi Arabia
Expatriate football managers in Kuwait
Expatriate football managers in Saudi Arabia
Expatriate football managers in Bahrain
Bahraini Premier League managers
Saudi First Division League managers
Saudi Professional League managers